Bedelia may refer to:

Bédélia, the archetype of the French cyclecars
Bedelia (novel), a 1945 novel by Vera Caspary
Bedelia (film), a 1946 film adaptation of the novel
Bonnie Bedelia (born 1948), American actress
Amelia Bedelia, the protagonist and title character of a series of American children's books written by Peggy Parish
Bedelia Du Maurier, a fictional character in the TV series Hannibal
Bedelia (Saturday Night Live), a character in three Saturday Night Live episodes
Bedelia (beetle), a genus of leaf beetles